Changsŏng County is a kun, or county, in northern North Phyŏngan province, North Korea.  It is bordered by Pyŏktong to the east, Tongchang and Taegwan to the south, Sakchu to the west; to the north, it faces China across the Yalu (Amrok) River.

Name
Changsŏng appears as "Changseong" in South Korea's Revised Romanization and as Changcheng in Chinese records, as during its occupation by Mao Wenlong's forces during the Manchu conquest of China.

Geography
Changsŏng's terrain is steep and mountainous, sloping generally downward from the southeast toward the Yalu.  The Kangnam Mountains and Pandŏk Mountains both pass through the county. The highest point is Piraebong, at 1470 m. The county is drained by various tributaries of the Yalu, including the Yŏngjuchŏn (영주천) and Namchangchŏn (남창천), as well as by the Changsŏng River, a tributary of the Taeryŏng.   The Yalu itself has been blocked by the Suphung Dam to create Suphung Lake.

Administrative divisions
Changsŏng county is divided into 1 ŭp (town). 1 rodongjagu (workers' district) and 15 ri (villages):

Climate
Annual rainfall in Changsŏng is 1000 mm, with an annual average temperature of 7.3 °C (the average fluctuating from -11.6 °C in January to 22 °C in August).  Temperatures are of course much colder in the mountains, with the snows atop Piraebong not melting until late May.  Fog is common near Suphung Lake.  Some 80% of the county's land is forested, while only 6.1% is under cultivation.

Economy
Sericulture is widely practised; other crops include maize, rice, peanuts, gochu peppers, sweet potatoes, and various fruits. Changsŏng also leads the county in the production of sheep. Various products, including lumber and medicinal herbs, are harvested from the forests. In addition, gold, tungsten, and coal are mined from the hills. Local manufactured products include gochujang and alcohol.

Transportation
There are no railroads, but a road does connect Changsŏng to Sakchu, Tongchang, and Pyŏktong.  Freight and passenger traffic is also carried by ships plying Lake Suphung; the lake is also used to transport raw lumber.

Notes

References

See also
Geography of North Korea
Administrative divisions of North Korea
North Pyongan

External links

Counties of North Pyongan